Yanchang County is a county under the administration of the prefecture-level city of Yan'an, in the northeast of Shaanxi Province, bordering Shanxi Province across the Yellow River to the east.

Administrative divisions
Yanchang County consists of one subdistrict and seven towns. These are then further divided into 159 administrative villages.

Qilicun Subdistrict 
 is the county's sole subdistrict. Qilicun Subdistrict host's the county's administrative offices.

Towns 
Yanchang County contains the following seven towns:

 
 
 
 
 
 
 

Geography 
The Yellow River passes through the county, as does the Yan River. The county has a forest coverage of 23%.

Climate 
Yanchang County experiences distinctive seasons in regards to both temperature and precipitation. The county has warm and wet summers, and cold and dry winters.

History 
Human activity in Yanchang County can be traced back thousands of years, and the first administrative district in the area arose in 266 AD.

Qingjian Uprising and Communist insurgency 
Communist activity in the area began in January 1927, when a Communist Party branch was set up at a high school in the county. However, Communist Party activity in the region continued in subsequent years. In the spring of 1932, a communist uprising in the area occurred yet again, and the Communist Party organized militias afterwards. On May 30, 1935, Communist troops successfully took control of the county. Communist forces would retain control of the county during the rest of the Civil War, as well as during the Japanese Invasion of China.

Economy 
As of 2018, the county's GDP was 5.408 billion Yuan, an increase of 8.7% from the previous year. Urban residents had an average disposable income of 34,170 Yuan, and rural residents had an average disposable income of 11,105 Yuan.

Agriculture 
The county's main agricultural products are apples, pears, and watermelons.

Mineral Resources 
The county has vast deposits, mainly of petroleum, coal, natural gas, and salt.

Oil 
The county is home to China's first oil well, which was constructed on June 5, 1907. During Mao Zedong's rule, oil production in the county was encouraged.

Wangjiachuan Petroleum Drilling Company 
In 1985, the county established its own oil company, called Wangjiachuan Petroleum Drilling Company. The company was run by the county government, the first oil company in China to be structured as such. The company dug its first well on May 29, 1985, and produced 1,005 tons of crude oil by the end of the year. By the late 1990s, the company's output hovered at around 14,000 tons per year. In 2000, the county government launched reforms meant to boost its productivity, and in 2005 the company had merged into the Yanchang Oilfield Company Ltd.

Present-Day Situation 
After merging into Yanchang Oilfield, the county's oil production further expanded, achieving a stable annual output of approximately 250,000 tons from 2005 through 2010. The county now has three oil production plants, which combine for an annual output in excess of 600,000 tons.

Coal 
The county has coal reserves of 20.92 million tons.

Natural Gas 
The county's natural gas reserves total  in area, and 100 billion cubic meters in volume.

Salt 
The county's salt reserves total 4.838 billion tons.

Culture 
Like other regions of Shaanbei, the county has a rich tradition of paper cutting. Major tourist sites include historic and archaeological sites, red tourism sites, as well as various natural sites, particularly mountains.

Transportation 
The county is served by a number of highways, such as Shaanxi Provincial Highway 201 and Shaanxi Provincial Highway 205.

References

External links
Old Yanchang County Government website
New Yanchang County Government website

 
County-level divisions of Shaanxi
Yan'an